Yeshiva Birchas Chaim is a Haredi Mesivta high school in Lakewood Township, New Jersey.

It was founded by Rabbi Shmuel Zalmen Stein in 2001, after his father, Rabbi Chaim Stein, asked him to open a branch of Telshe Yeshiva in Lakewood.

As of the 2017–18 school year, the school had an enrollment of 103 students and 7.3 classroom teachers (on an FTE basis), for a student–teacher ratio of 14.1:1. The school's student body was 100% White.

Curriculum 

The curriculum focuses primarily on Talmudic texts and commentary.  It also includes mussar Chumash, and Halachah.

References

2001 establishments in New Jersey
Educational institutions established in 2001
Haredi Judaism in New Jersey
Jewish day schools in New Jersey
Lakewood Township, New Jersey
Private high schools in Ocean County, New Jersey